Tobi Sokolow (born July 15, 1942) is an American bridge player. She won major tournaments as Tobi Deutsch as well. As of 2016, she ranked 10th among women in the world by masterpoints and 11th by placing points that do not decay over time.

Sokolow learned bridge in her thirties, unusually late for a top player. She has won five world titles and 20 North American Bridge Championships events including the 2002 Life Master Pairs. At Verona, Italy, in 2004 she became the first American man or woman to win the Generali World Masters Individual.

Sokolow was born in Cleveland, Ohio. Her husband David is a law professor at the University of Texas School of Law. They live in Austin, Texas, where she was a real estate agent. Her son Adam is a restaurateur in Austin.

Sokolow was one of 24 women, six from each of four countries, invited to participate in the SportAccord World Mind Games, December 2011 in Beijing. Her partner was Janice Seamon-Molson. The American women won the Women's Team gold medal, and Sokolow placed third in the Individuals – a tournament (now rarely-contested) in which every player has a different partner in every round.  She finished second in the team event in 2012.

On September 7th 2021, Sokolow was added to the American Contract Bridge League's "Currently under Discipline" list as having resigned to avoid possible disciplinary action.

Bridge accomplishments

Awards
 Fishbein Trophy 2002

Wins
 Venice Cup (2) 1997, 2003
 McConnell Cup (1) 2006
 World Bridge Games (1) 2016
 North American Bridge Championships (20)
Life Master Pairs (1) 2002
 Senior Mixed Pairs (1) 2019
Women's Board-a-Match Teams (6) 1994, 1999, 2003, 2011, 2014, 2015
Women's Knockout Teams (4) 1997, 2000, 2001, 2007
Women's Swiss Teams (3) 2002, 2009, 2011
North American Women's Swiss Teams (2) 1984, 1985
Life Master Women's Pairs (1) 1991
Women's Pairs (2) 1987, 1990
 Women's United States Bridge Championship (7) 1992, 1997, 1999, 2003, 2004, 2008, 2016
 Other notable wins:
 Generali World Masters Individual (1) 2004
World Mind Sports Games Women's Teams (1) 2011

Runners-up
 Venice Cup (2) 2000, 2015
 World Women Team Olympiad (1) 2004
 North American Bridge Championships (14)
 Mixed Board-a-Match Teams (1) 2005
 Women's Board-a-Match Teams (4) 1997, 2009, 2010, 2012
 Women's Knockout Teams (3) 2002, 2003, 2012
 Women's Swiss Teams (5) 1988, 1995, 1999, 2000, 2003
 Women's Pairs (1) 2001
 Women's US Bridge Championship (3) 1995, 2011, 2015
 Other notable 2nd places:
 Buffett Cup (1) 2008

References

External links

 SOKOLOW Tobi athlete information at the 1st SportAccord World Mind Games (2011)

1942 births
American contract bridge players
Venice Cup players
People from Cleveland
People from Austin, Texas
Living people